Major-General Robert Ross (176612 September 1814) was an Irish officer in the British Army who served in the Napoleonic Wars and its  theatre in North America in the War of 1812.

Ross joined the British Army in 1789. He served as an officer in several battles during the Napoleonic Wars, including the Battles of Maida and Corunna, gaining promotion to colonel. In 1809, he was sent to serve in the Peninsular War, including the Battles of Vittoria, Roncesvalles, Sorauren, and Orthez. He was wounded in the neck at the Battle of Orthez in France on 27 February 1814.

Upon returning to duty later that year, Ross was made a major general and sent to North America, as commander of "all British forces on the East Coast". In August 1814, he reached Benedict, Maryland and continued on, leading the professional soldiers who quickly defeated a poorly organized American militia at the Battle of Bladensburg on 24 August; that evening, he led his troops into Washington D.C.

During his command of the Burning of Washington many important U.S. Government buildings, including the White House and the Capitol were damaged, demoralizing and greatly damaging the American war effort. Ross then led a British invasion north up the Chesapeake Bay towards the city of Baltimore which culminated in the Battle of Baltimore that September. On 12 September, he was shot while commanding troops at North Point, and died while being moved to the rear.

Early life
Ross was born in Rostrevor, County Down, Ireland, to Major David Ross, an officer in the Seven Years' War and his wife, Elizabeth Adderley, the maternal half-sister of James Caulfeild, 1st Earl of Charlemont. He was educated at Trinity College Dublin in Ireland, where he was a treasurer of the College Historical Society and joined the 25th Regiment of Foot as an ensign in 1789.

Napoleonic Wars

Ross fought as a junior officer at the battles of Krabbendam in the Netherlands in 1799 and the Battle of Alexandria in Egypt in 1801. In 1803, he was promoted to major and given command of the 20th Regiment of Foot. He next fought at the Battle of Maida in the Kingdom of Naples in 1806.

Peninsular War
He was promoted to lieutenant–colonel at the end of 1808 and fought in the Battle of Corunna in Spain in early 1809 during the Peninsular War. In 1810, Ross was made a full colonel as well as aide-de-camp to the King.

In 1813, Ross was sent to serve under Arthur Wellesley and commanded his regiment at the battles of Vittoria, Roncesvalles, and Sorauren that year. He was seriously wounded in the left side of his neck at the Battle of Orthez, on 27 February 1814, and had just returned to service when he was given command of an expeditionary force to attack the United States.

War of 1812

Ross sailed to North America as a major general to take charge of all British troops off the east coast of the United States. He personally led the British troops ashore in Benedict, Maryland, and marched through Upper Marlboro, Maryland, to the attack on the Americans at the Battle of Bladensburg on 24 August 1814, routing the hastily organised militia units that opposed him. Moving on from Bladensburg, Ross moved on to nearby Washington, D.C., and was fired upon; his horse was shot from under him. The public buildings, facilities and Navy Yards of the city, including the United States Capitol and the White House were burned as retaliation for destructive American raids into Canada, most notably the Americans' Burning of York (modern-day Toronto) earlier in 1813. Controversy surrounds Ross's decision to destroy public property but spare private property during the burning.

The capture of Washington

Ross then was persuaded to attack Baltimore, Maryland. He led British troops to the area. At the time, "he had no intention whatsoever of attacking Washington," according to a historian. Nonetheless, he marched on the capital and joined his troops with others who had arrived from Bermuda, led by Rear-Admiral Sir George Cockburn, 10th Baronet. In spite of a larger contingent of American defenders, the British captured Washington with a force of 4,500 "battle hardened" men. On 24 August, the Burning of Washington occurred, as the troops, directed by Ross, set fire to  a number of public buildings, including the White House and the United States Capitol. Extensive damage to the interiors and the contents of both were subsequently reported.

Ross refused to accept the recommendation of Rear Admiral Cockburn to also damage private property.  The attack on the National Intelligencer newspaper was led by Cockburn.
Ross ordered the preservation of private property however, threatening his men with punishment if they disobeyed.

A CBC News article described Ross as a "reluctant arsonist" who needed persuasion from Cockburn to cause intentional damage. Although Cockburn had been optimistic about the possibility of capturing the capital city, Ross "never dreamt for one minute that an army of 3,500 men with 1,000 marines reinforcement, with no cavalry, hardly any artillery, could march 50 miles inland and capture an enemy capital.

Death

His troops subsequently landed at the southern tip of the "Patapsco Neck" peninsula (between the Patapsco River and Baltimore Harbor on the south and Back River on the north) of southeastern Baltimore County at North Point, twelve miles southeast from the city, on the morning of 12 September 1814. En route to what would be the Battle of North Point, a part of the larger Battle of Baltimore, the British advance encountered American skirmishers. General Ross rode forward to personally direct his troops. An American sharpshooter shot him through the right arm into the chest. According to Baltimore folklore, two American riflemen, Daniel Wells, 18, and Henry McComas, 19, fired at him and one of them had fired the fatal shot. Ross died while he was being transported back to the fleet.

Ross's earlier efforts during the more successful Battle of Bladensburg on 24 August 1814 deserve praise, according to the author of a book about that era. "He conducted a brilliant campaign of deception, feinting one way or the other, marching and then doubling back, and was able to paralyze the Americans and prevent them from defending Bladensburg".
 
Ross's body was preserved in a barrel of 129 gallons (586 L) of Jamaican rum aboard HMS Tonnant. When the Tonnant was diverted to New Orleans for the forthcoming battle in January 1815, his body was shipped on the British ship HMS Royal Oak to Halifax, Nova Scotia, where his body was interred on 29 September 1814 in the Old Burying Ground.

Legacy

In Ross's home village of Rostrevor, County Down in Northern Ireland, he is commemorated by a 99-foot granite obelisk near the shoreline of Carlingford Lough. The Monument, a 100-foot granite obelisk, was restored in 2008. A smaller monument was erected in Kilbroney Parish Church by troops who had served with Ross at the Battle of Maida in 1806. This granite memorial was erected in 1826 "on a hill within view of his heartbroken widow’s home", according to a 2013 report.

Ross is also commemorated by a National Monument in St Paul's Cathedral in London, England. The latter is described by a book about Ross as: "Britannia is represented weeping over the tomb of the departed warrior, over which an, American flag is being deposited by a figure of Valour, while Fame descends with a wreath of laurels to crown the hero’s head".

The inscription on the National Monument reads:

By the beginning of the Troubles in the 1960s, the monument in Rostrevor—now located in a predominantly Roman Catholic region—was largely neglected and overgrown by brambles; this may have contributed to its avoiding the same fate as Nelson's Pillar in Dublin, which was reportedly blown up by the IRA in 1966. After the Good Friday Agreement in 1998, the Newry and Mourne District Council, though largely Irish republican, agreed to refurbish the monument as part of Rostrevor's history, and it was reopened in 2008.

Neither General Ross nor his immediate descendants were knighted or received a title of nobility. However, his descendants were given an augmentation of honour to the Ross armorial bearings (namely, the addition of a chief to the shield and a second crest, both depicting an arm grasping the 15 stars and 15 stripes on a broken staff, along with the additional motto of "Bladensburg") and the family name was changed to the victory title "Ross-of-Bladensburg", which was granted to his widow.

In honour of the history of Washington, D.C., there is also a portrait of Ross in the U. S. Capitol's rotunda and several illustrations in various War of 1812 historical sites in the Baltimore area, including a Monument near the site off Old North Point Road where he supposedly was shot. Additional details and exhibits have been preserved in various Baltimore historical institutions, such as the Star Spangled Banner Flag House (also known recently as the Flag House and Star-Spangled Banner Museum) and the National Park Service site of Fort McHenry's visitor center exhibits and in the local Dundalk-Patapsco Neck Historical Society museum in Dundalk, Maryland.

According to a history of the Major-General by Robert Lacy,Ross was a soldier who combined caution with courage. He was immensely popular with his men because of his willingness to share their hardships and to fight alongside them in the thick of battle. A colleague said of him that
he could not be 'a better man nor a more zealous officer'. Ross also commanded the respect and admiration of his opponents because of his unfailing courtesy and chivalrous conduct. One of the leading physicians in Washington paid tribute to Ross’s ‘consummate modesty and politeness’.

Local lore indicates that the two snipers/riflemen "Wells and McComas" (of the unit of Aisquith's Sharpshooters") were buried in a local churchyard mourned by their fellow soldiers and citizens of the Town, but later in the 1850s were exhumed and reburied after elaborate processions and funerals in a monumental tomb in Ashland Square, off of Orleans Street and North Gay Street in the Jonestown/Old Town neighborhood of East Baltimore.  City streets were also named for them in South Baltimore.

Notes

Further reading 
McCavitt, John, and Christopher T. George. The Man Who Captured Washington: Major General Robert Ross and the War of 1812. Norman: University of Oklahoma Press, 2016.  see online review
Ross is a featured supporting character in Eric Flint's alternate history novels, 1812: The Rivers of War, and 1824: The Arkansas War.

References

External links

Ross's Monument in St. Paul's Cathedral, London
Ross's Monument in Rostrevor, County Down, Northern Ireland and discussion of his career
Guide to the Robert Ross Papers, 1813-1873, Special Collections Research Center, Estelle and Melvin Gelman Library, The George Washington University

1766 births
1814 deaths
Alumni of Trinity College Dublin
19th-century Anglo-Irish people
British Army generals
British Army personnel of the Napoleonic Wars
British Army personnel of the War of 1812
British military personnel killed in the War of 1812
Burials in Canada
Deaths by firearm in Maryland
King's Own Scottish Borderers officers
Lancashire Fusiliers officers
People from Rostrevor
18th-century Irish people
19th-century Irish people
British people of the War of 1812
British military personnel of the War of 1812